Nathan "Happy" Perez is an American record producer, audio engineer, songwriter and musician. He first rose to prominence for producing Young Bleed's debut album All I Have in This World, Are... My Balls and My Word. He co-wrote and produced the Baby Bash song "Suga Suga" featuring Frankie J that peaked at number 7 on the US Billboard Hot 100. He dropped out of high school to make music.

Discography

Mixtapes 
2009 - The Self Employed Mixtape, Vol. 1

Production discography

Charted singles (as songwriter)

References

Living people
American record producers
Year of birth missing (living people)